Joanne Gavin (1932–2021) was a civil rights activist.

Life 
Gavin was born July 19, 1932 in Denver.

She worked with Congress of Racial Equality in San Francisco. She attended the March on Washington. She worked with Student Nonviolent Coordinating Committee, in Washington, D.C. She organized a  Freedom School for the Tougaloo community. She was a secretary at Tougaloo College.  

She wrote for Workers World. She wrote Cordelia's Column, under the pen name Cordelia Nikkalaos.

She co-founded the Texas Death Penalty Abolition Movement.

She died on February 11, 2021, in Houston.

See also 

 Capital punishment in Texas

References 

1932 births
2021 deaths
American civil rights activists
People from Denver